Wild Life Sydney Zoo (formerly Sydney Wildlife World) is a wildlife park in the Darling Harbour precinct, on the western edge of the Sydney central business district, Sydney, New South Wales, Australia. Opened in September 2006, the zoo is located adjacent to a leisure and retail precinct that includes the SEA LIFE Sydney Aquarium and Madame Tussauds Sydney.

History
In May 2006, Sydney Aquarium Pty Ltd announced plans to expand the existing aquarium site, in order to incorporate a wildlife park. Following this announcement, and after the acquisition of the tourist attractions at Sydney Tower and of Manly Oceanarium, Sydney Aquarium Pty Ltd changed its name to Sydney Attractions Group. Village Roadshow Limited purchased Sydney Attractions Group in late 2007. UK attractions group Merlin Entertainments bought Sydney Wildlife World as part of its acquisition of Village Roadshow assets in March 2011.

The park changed its name to Wild Life Sydney Zoo (trademarked as Wild Life Sydney) and re-opened on 13 September 2011.

The attraction won the Award for the best family-focused tourism at The Australians 2007 Travel and Tourism Awards.

Design
Construction began in November 2004 on the site, and was completed in August 2006. Wild Life Sydney is unusual for a zoo or wildlife park in that the public areas are almost entirely enclosed and air-conditioned. The A$52 million development features a  walkway which snakes through  of enclosures.

The upper level exhibits are open-air, enclosed only by a large stainless steel mesh roof structure supported by curved beams, which were designed to look like the ribs of the rainbow serpent of Aboriginal myth when viewed from above. This open-air feature has enabled the exhibits to be landscaped naturally with live plants, including full-sized trees. The largest exhibit is the  semi-arid habitat of kangaroo walkabout, featuring  of red sand trucked in from central Australia and full-sized bottle trees. This habitat houses Kangaroo Island kangaroos, echidnas, a quokka and koalas.

Exhibits
Wild Life Sydney Zoo is divided into ten zones, containing the following exhibits:Tricky Tongues and Treehouse Boyd's forest dragon
 Broad-shelled river turtle
 Eastern water dragon
 Goodfellow's tree-kangaroo
 Merten's water monitor
 Northern long-necked turtle
 Numbat
 Scrub python
 Short-beaked echidna
 White-lipped tree frogDevil's Den Blotched blue-tongued lizard
 Cunningham's spiny-tailed skink
 Eastern brown snake
 Emerald dove
 Inland taipan
 Satin bowerbird
 Tasmanian devilGumtree Valley Brown cuckoo-dove
 Bush stone-curlew
 Gouldian finch
 Koala
 Laughing kookaburra
 Princess parrotWallaby Cliffs Bare-nosed wombat
 Chestnut-eared finch
 Red-browed finch
 Spencer's goanna
 Yellow-footed rock wallabyDaintree Rainforest Australian green tree frog
 Australian king parrot
 Boyd's forest dragon
 Brown cuckoo-dove
 Emerald dove
 Frill-neck lizard
 Green and golden bell frog
 Magnificent tree frog
 Plumed whistling duck
 Red-browed finch
 Red-legged pademelon
 Satin bowerbird
 Southern cassowary
 Topknot pigeon
 Wonga pigeonKangaroo Walkabout Agile wallaby
 Australian king parrot
 Budgerigar
 Chestnut-breasted mannikin
 Chestnut-eared finch
 Cockatiel
 Eastern grey kangaroo
 Emerald dove
 Galah
 Gouldian finch
 Kangaroo Island grey kangaroo
 Princess parrot
 Red-browed finch
 Spinifex pigeon
 White-browed woodswallow
 White-headed pigeon
 Wonga pigeonKakadu Gorge Banded rainbowfish
 Central bearded dragon
 Central netted dragon
 Crimson-spotted rainbowfish
 Dwarf bearded dragon
 Freshwater crocodile
 Frill-neck lizard
 Olive python
 Pig-nosed turtle
 Red-collared lorikeet
 Seven-spot archerfish
 Shingleback lizardPlatypus Pool PlatypusNight Fall Bilby
 Black-headed python
 Centralian knob-tailed gecko
 Feathertail glider
 Ghost bat
 Night skink
 Rufous bettong
 Spotted python
 Woma python
 Yellow-bellied gliderDiscovery Treehouse Blue yabby
 Cyclone Larry stick insect
 Giant bull ant
 Giant burrowing cockroach
 Golden-tailed gecko
 Goliath stick-insect
 Mitchell's rainforest snail
 Queensland whistling tarantula
 Redback spider
 Spinifex hopping mouse
 Superworm
 Sydney funnel-web spider
 Sydney huntsman spider
 Wolf spiderKoala Rooftop (including Koala Rooftop Cafe)'
 Koala

Experiences

Wild Life Sydney offers a range of experiences for their guests. These experiences include breakfast with the koalas, which entails an early morning guided tour around the zoo before a buffet breakfast with the koalas as well as a photo taken with a koala. Koala photos are also available throughout the day.

Additionally, the zoo offers a behind the scenes guided tour. Private dining experiences are also available.

See also

 Merlin Entertainments

References

External links

Merlin Entertainments Group
Zoos in New South Wales
Wildlife parks in Australia
2006 establishments in Australia
2011 establishments in Australia
Parks in Sydney
Buildings and structures in Sydney
Darling Harbour
Tourist attractions in Sydney